Llapashticë e Poshtme is a village in Podujevë municipality in Kosovo.

Notes

References 

Villages in Podujevo